The 1976 Kent State Golden Flashes football team was an American football team that represented Kent State University in the Mid-American Conference (MAC) during the 1976 NCAA Division I football season. In their second season under head coach Dennis Fitzgerald, the Golden Flashes compiled an 8–4 record (6–2 against MAC opponents), finished in second place in the MAC, and outscored all opponents by a combined total of 280 to 206.

The team's statistical leaders included Art Best with 1,030 rushing yards, Mike Whalen with 822 passing yards, and Kim Featsent with 415 receiving yards. Five Kent State players were selected as first-team All-MAC players: wide receiver Kim Featsent, offensive tackle Tom Jesko, linebacker Jack Lazor, placekicker Paul Marchese, and defensive lineman Mike Zele.

Schedule

References

Kent State
Kent State Golden Flashes football seasons
Kent State Golden Flashes football